UFC 97: Redemption (not to be confused with UFC 17: Redemption) was a mixed martial arts event held by the Ultimate Fighting Championship (UFC) on April 18, 2009 in Montreal, Quebec, Canada.

Background
This event broke the UFC attendance record that was set 364 days earlier in Montreal at UFC 83.

Due to time constraints, the preliminary bout between Sam Stout and Matt Wiman was moved to the main card, resulting in a six-fight live main card.

Sanctioning and rules controversy
On February 12, 2009, reports surfaced that province regulators ("Régie des alcools, des courses et des jeux", or RACJ) requested a set of rule changes that differ from the Unified Rules of MMA put the event at risk from taking place. The proposed rule changes banned elbow and knee strikes, mandated a smaller cage, and would stop a fight when a fighter gets knocked down. Before, the RACJ has followed the Unified Rules, but as laws differ by city, state, or province, a commission can insist on the usage of its own rules.

On February 18, 2009, it was announced that UFC officials were able to convince the RACJ to reverse its stand and use the Unified Rules. As a concession, the UFC agreed to the banning of foot stomps for this event.

Results

Bonus awards
Fighters were awarded $70,000 bonuses.

Fight of the Night: Sam Stout vs. Matt Wiman
Knockout of the Night: Maurício Rua
Submission of the Night: Krzysztof Soszynski

See also
 Ultimate Fighting Championship
 List of UFC champions
 List of UFC events
 2009 in UFC

References

Ultimate Fighting Championship events
Mixed martial arts in Canada
Sports competitions in Montreal
2009 in mixed martial arts
2009 in Canadian sports
2009 in Quebec